Yorkton is a city located in south-eastern Saskatchewan, Canada. It is about 450 kilometres north-west of Winnipeg and 300 kilometres south-east of Saskatoon and is the sixth largest city in the province.

As of 2017 the census population of the city was 19,643. Yorkton has had a growth rate of 4.3% since 2011.

Yorkton was founded in 1882 and incorporated as a city in 1928. The city is bordered by the rural municipalities of Orkney to the north, west, and south, and Wallace on the east.

History 
In 1882 a group of businessmen and investors formed the York Farmers Colonization Company.  Authorized to issue up to $300,000 in debentures and lenient government credit terms on land purchases encouraged company representatives to visit the District of Assiniboia of the North-West Territories with the intent to view some crown land available near the Manitoba border. They were impressed with what they saw and the group purchased portions of six townships near the Little Whitesand River (now Yorkton Creek) for the purpose of settlement and to establish a centre for trade there. This centre would become known as York Colony.

The company founded the settlers' colony on the banks of the Little Whitesand River where lots were given freely to settlers who purchased land from them.  The colony remained at its site until 1889.  It was originally located at PT SE 1/4 13-26-4 W2M.

In 1889 the rail line was extended to the Yorkton area.  It was at this time  the colony townsite relocated alongside the new rail line.

Geography 
Yorkton is located in the aspen parkland ecosystem. The terrain is mainly one of agriculture and there is no forestry industry. It is also in an area of black calcareous chernozemic soils. The Yorkton area was located on the edge of an area of a maximum glacial lake. The quaternary geology has left the area as a moraine plain consisting of glacial deposits. The bedrock geology is the Pembina Member of Vermillion River Formation and Riding Mountain Formation.  Yorkton is located in the physiographic region of the Quill Lake-Yorkton Plain region of the Saskatchewan Plains Region.

Climate 
Yorkton has a humid continental climate (Köppen climate classification Dfb), with extreme seasonal temperatures.

Extreme weather events 
 On the evening of July 1, 2010, Yorkton received a severe thunderstorm warning. Soon after, Yorkton was experiencing pea sized hail, strong winds, lightning and heavy rain. The rain created a flash flood. Broadway Street received the worst of the flood with local businesses being severely damaged, with one being completely destroyed.  The City of Yorkton declared a State of Emergency and the Canadian Red Cross helped out with the victims of the flood.
 On the weekend of June 29, 2014, Yorkton declared a State of Emergency after rain caused flash floods in south eastern Saskatchewan.

Demographics 

The first settlers to the Yorkton colony were English from Eastern Ontario and Great Britain.   west were Scottish settlers at the settlement of Orkney. A significant number of residents are also descended from immigrants from Ukraine who came in the early 20th century.

Attractions 

The Yorkton Gallagher Centre is an entertainment complex constructed in 1977 by the civic government and the Yorkton Exhibition Association. The centre includes an arena, curling rink, conference rooms and an indoor swimming pool. Until 2005, the facility was called the Parkland Agriplex. In the early 1900s an older Agriplex building was located on the fair grounds adjacent to the Gallagher Centre.

Yorkton is home to a branch of the Saskatchewan Western Development Museum, which houses a number of exhibits depicting pioneer life in the town and on the surrounding prairie.  The museum includes an early pioneer log home and an extensive outdoor exhibit of agricultural machinery, including early tractors and steam engines.

Located on several buildings in downtown Yorkton are murals depicting historic personalities.

Historic sites 

A number of heritage buildings are located within the city. Yorkton Tower Theatre is a single screen movie theatre built in the 1950s. Army Navy and Air Force Veterans Building, Dulmage Farmstead, Hudson's Bay Company Store, St. Paul's Lutheran Church, Yorkton Armoury, Yorkton Court House, 29 Myrtle Avenue, 81 Second Avenue North, Old Land Titles Building and Yorkton Organic Milling Ltd are also listed historic places.

Yorkton Film Festival 

Film Festivals have been an enduring part of life in Yorkton since the projector spun to life in October 1947.  At that time the Yorkton International Documentary Film Festival was born. The international component was dropped in 1977, deciding to focus on Canadian short film instead.  The festival renamed itself the Yorkton Short Film Festival also in 1977. In 2009 it became the Yorkton Film Festival.

Sports 

The city of Yorkton hosted the 1999 Royal Bank Cup (Junior "A" ice hockey National Championship), the 2006 World Junior A Challenge (an international Junior "A" ice hockey tournament) and the 2009 Canada Cup of Curling.

Teams 
The Yorkton Terriers are a team in the Saskatchewan Junior Hockey League. The Yorkton Rawtec Maulers are a Midget AAA ice hockey team and they are a member of the SMAAAHL. The teams play their games in the 2,300 seat Westland Arena in the Yorkton Gallagher Centre

Yorkton Cardinals were a baseball team playing in the Western Canadian Baseball League.

The Yorkton Bulldogs are a retired box lacrosse team formed in 2003. They are a member of the Prairie Gold Lacrosse League.

Government

Municipal 

The current mayor as of 2020 is Mitch Hippsley. He is serving with councillors Randy Goulden, Quinn Haider, Dustin Brears, Darcy Zaharia, Chris Wyatt, and Ken Chyz.

Provincial 

The city is located in the Provincial Electoral District of Yorkton.  This riding is served in the Legislative Assembly of Saskatchewan by Saskatchewan Party MLA Greg Ottenbreit.

Federal 

The federal constituency of Yorkton—Melville is represented in the House of Commons of Canada by Cathay Wagantall of the Conservative Party of Canada.

From 1968 to 1993, Yorkton was represented federally by New Democratic Party MP Lorne Nystrom who at his first election win was the youngest person to be elected to the Canadian Parliament.

Infrastructure

Health care 
Yorkton established its first hospital in 1902, and this was followed by a maternity care home which lasted a couple of decades. The original hospital was converted into a residential apartment, which in 2014 suffered a large fire which engulfed the entire building. The current hospital, the Yorkton Regional Health Centre, is located on Bradbrooke Drive and is part of the Sunrise Health Region.

Transportation

Air 
It is now operated as the Yorkton Municipal Airport .

Roads 
Yorkton is located at the intersection of Hwy 52, Hwy 10, Hwy 9 and The Yellowhead which is part of the Trans Canada Highway

Rail 

Yorkton is served by Canadian National Railway (JCT Yorkton Sub, Sk. (CN)) branch line and Canadian Pacific Railway (Yorkton IMS, Sk (CPRS)) mainline track.

Transit 
Yorkton Transit runs two routes, covering the majority of the city.

Education

Tertiary institutions 

Parkland College has campuses in Yorkton.

High schools 

Sacred Heart High School was founded by the Sisters Servants of Mary Immaculate, and the school celebrated its 75th Anniversary in 1991.
Dream Builders is an alternative education program offering grades 6 through 12 with a work experience component. Yorkton Regional High School opened November 10, 1967 offering grades 9 to 12.

Elementary schools 
There are four separate Catholic elementary schools.  St. Alphonsus Elementary School provides pre-kindergarten through Grade 8.  St. Mary's Elementary School offers pre-kindergarten classes to grade 8. St. Michael's Elementary School offers both English and French immersion from Kindergarten to grade 8.  St. Paul's Elementary School also belongs to the Christ the Teacher Catholic School Division, and provides Kindergarten to Grade 8 classes.

The public elementary schools are also four in total.  Columbia Elementary School has an approximate enrolment of 340 students and offers pre-Kindergarten to Grade 8.
Dr. Brass Elementary School is named after the dentist, Dr. David James Brass and offers pre-Kindergarten to Grade 8.  M.C. Knoll Elementary School opened in August 1998, and is named after Milton Clifford Knoll.  Yorkdale Central School is also a part of Good Spirit School Division No. 204 and offers Kindergarten to Grade 8.

Military 

The 64th (Yorkton) Field Battery, Royal Canadian Artillery is garrisoned at the Yorkton Armouries.

During World War II the Yorkton airport was home to No. 23 Elementary Flying Training School and No. 11 Service Flying Training School – both schools being a part of the British Commonwealth Air Training Plan. Among the present users is a Gliding Centre, operated for the Royal Canadian Air Cadets.

The Royal Canadian Air Force Station Yorkton (ADC ID: C-51) was a Long Range Radar (LRR) and Ground Air Transmitter Receiver (GATR) facility of the Pinetree Line. The site was SAGE compatible from day one. The facility which was in use during the Cold War was renamed CFS Yorkton (Canadian Forces Station) in 1967. The station located near Yorkton was operational from 1963–1986.

Media

Newspapers 
Weeklies
 The Yorkton News Review (defunct) 
 Yorkton This Week

Radio

Television 
Cable television services are supplied by Access Communications. Access is a Saskatchewan-owned not-for-profit co-operative established in 1974. It also supplies home phone and Internet service to the community.

SaskTel provides maxTV services on both DSL and Fiber. SaskTel is a Crown Corporation owned by the provincial government to serve the people of Saskatchewan with telephone, Internet, and TV services.

The only terrestrial television station serving Yorkton is CICC-TV channel 10, a CTV affiliate station.

Yorkton was previously served by CKOS-TV channel 5, a private CBC Television outlet; formerly a sister station of CICC, it became an owned-and-operated repeater of CBKT in 2002, before closing down with the rest of CBC's repeater network in 2012.

See also
List of communities in Saskatchewan
List of cities in Saskatchewan

References

External links 

 
Cities in Saskatchewan
Orkney No. 244, Saskatchewan
Populated places established in 1882
Division No. 9, Saskatchewan